Anthony Hirst (born 21 January 1967) is an English actor, theatre director and narrator best known for playing Mike Barnes on the soap opera Hollyoaks and in Coronation Street as Paul Kershaw, the love interest of Eileen Grimshaw. Hirst also narrates the UK version of How It's Made, shown on Quest and the Discovery channels, and various programmes for Channel 4.

Filmography 
Hirst's acting roles include Mike Barnes from Hollyoaks, Martin Gooch from The Ghost Squad and Steve Kingsley from Holby City. He has narrated TV documentaries such as Blueprint for Disaster, 2005, The Garage, Smash Lab, and How It's Made since 2001. He also narrates some of the programme trailers on Fox and Channel 4. Hirst appeared as a fireman called Paul on Coronation Street during the show's 50th anniversary in December 2010. Paul returned to Coronation Street as a regular character during October 2011. It was revealed on 24 February 2013 that Hirst would be leaving Coronation Street in 2013 at the end of his contract. In 2014, Tony Hirst narrated two seasons of Food Factory and in 2015 narrated season 1 of Home Factory both on Discovery science.

Other TV appearances 

Hirst appeared on Ready Steady Cook, on BBC Two on 5 March 2008, and lost to Zoë Lister, who played Zoe Carpenter in Hollyoaks. He played the part of Rom, a Roman man, on CBBC children's history programme The Romans in Britain shown on BBC2 and "Uncle Jake" in the BBC children's programme "The World Around Us". He played the part of a policeman in the first series of the Channel 4 show Shameless. He appeared on the Channel 4 show No Angels as an "ambulance chaser" in the first series.

Hirst narrates Benefits Street and the UK versions of Mike Rowe'''s Dirty Jobs and How It's Made'' on Discovery channels and Murder, Mystery and My Family on BBC. Hirst portrays a man sent back from the future to warn of an impending alien invasion in an ad being aired on Discovery Science to promote their Out of this World campaign.

Theatre 
Hirst produced two one-man shows touring the UK during the summer and autumn 2008, including four weeks at the Edinburgh Fringe Festival. The first play "Wombman", written and performed by Ricky Payne, which Hirst also directed and the second "Wacker Murphy's Bad Buzz" written and performed by Edwin Mullane.

Personal life 
Hirst lives with partner Sue Colgrave and they have two children, actress Kate Colgrave Pope and actor son Jack Colgrave Hirst. Hirst has an MSA Competition Licence and competed in the 2012 Silverstone Classic Celebrity Challenge race.

References

External links 

Living people
British male television actors
1967 births
British theatre directors
Male actors from Manchester